Virginia Ruzici defeated the defending champion Mima Jaušovec in the final, 6–2, 6–2 to win the women's singles tennis title at the 1978 French Open.

Seeds
The seeded players are listed below. Virginia Ruzici is the champion; others show the round in which they were eliminated.

  Mima Jaušovec (finalist)
  Virginia Ruzici (champion)
  Regina Maršíková (semifinals)
  Nancy Richey (second round)
  Kathy May (quarterfinals)
  Janet Newberry (first round)
  Katja Ebbinghaus (second round)
  Laura duPont (first round)
  Renáta Tomanová (second round)
  Florența Mihai (first round)
  Jeanne Evert (second round)
  Michelle Tyler (second round)
  Fiorella Bonicelli (quarterfinals)
  Mariana Simionescu (third round)
  Mareen Louie (second round)
  Caroline Stoll (first round)

Qualifying

Draw

Key
 Q = Qualifier
 WC = Wild card
 LL = Lucky loser
 r = Retired

Finals

Earlier rounds

Section 1

Section 2

Section 3

Section 4

References

External links
1978 French Open – Women's draws and results at the International Tennis Federation

Women's Singles
French Open by year – Women's singles
French Open - Women's Singles
1978 in women's tennis
1978 in French women's sport